Bert Deling is an Australian writer, script editor and director of film and TV best known for the cult classic Pure Shit (1975).

Select Credits
Dalmas (1973)
Pure Shit (1975)
Dead Easy (1982)
Keiron: The First Voyager (1985)

References

External links

Bert Deling at AustLit

Australian film directors
Living people
Year of birth missing (living people)